James Williams-Richardson (born 5 May 1988) is an Anguillan football player who is currently on trial at Premier League side Blackpool FC. William-Richardson used to play for Maidenhead United in the Conference South, and has now joined Penn & Tylers Green in the Hellenic Football League Division One East.

International career
Williams-Richardson made his debut for Anguilla in a World Cup qualification match against El Salvador in February 2008. He also played in the return match, his only two caps by December 2008.

References

External links
 

1988 births
Living people
Anguillan footballers
Maidenhead United F.C. players
Expatriate footballers in England
Association football midfielders
Anguilla international footballers